Princess Heungsu (Hangul: 흥수궁주 or 흥수공주, Hanja: 興壽宮主 or 興壽公主; d. 1123) was a Goryeo Royal Princess as the second daughter of King Sukjong and Queen Myeongui who later married her uncle's son–Wang Jeong the Count Seunghwa (승화백 왕정), and received "2,000 sik-eup" (식읍 2,000호) and "300 sik-sil" (식실 300호).

She firstly received her title and honor as a princess in 1102 (7th years reign of her father) and in 1105 (her eldest brother's ascension), she was given the "Sungdeok Palace" (숭덕궁, 崇德宮) as her own mansion. Six years later in 1111, Heungsu gave birth to her first son and upon hearing this, her eldest brother sent Gim Go (김고) on board to gave many gifts to her. According to the left records, she bore Wang Jeong two sons: Wang Jae (왕재) and Wang Gi (왕기). Meanwhile, the princess died in 1123 (ascension year of her nephew) and her husband died seven years after her in 1130.

Family
Father: Sukjong of Goryeo
Grandfather: Munjong of Goryeo
Grandmother: Queen Inye
Mother: Queen Myeongui
Grandfather: Yu Hong
Grandmother: Lady Gim
Husband: Wang Jeong, Count Seunghwa (승화백 왕정, 承化伯 王禎; d. 1130)
Father-in-law, formerly uncle: Wang Yeong, Duke Nakrang (낙랑공 왕영, 樂浪公 王瑛); son of King Jeonggan.
Mother-in-law, formerly aunt: Princess Boryeong (보령궁주, 保寧宮主); daughter of King Munjong and Queen Inye.
Issue(s):
1st son: Wang Jae (왕재, 王梓; d. 1164)
2nd son: Wang Gi (왕기, 王杞); married his mother's niece–Princess Seungdeok (승덕공주) and became known as "Count Hannam".

References

흥수궁주 on Goryeosa .

Goryeo princesses
1123 deaths
11th-century births
12th-century Korean women